William Murray Bremner (born 4 August 1946, in Aberdeen, Aberdeenshire, Scotland) is a Scottish guitarist, best known for his work in the band Rockpile and on many of Nick Lowe and Dave Edmunds' albums.  He has also played with The Pretenders, Shakin' Stevens, Carlene Carter and The Coal Porters, as well as issuing four solo albums.

Career overview
Bremner first became known playing with The Luvvers, who served as Lulu's backing band. However, by the time Bremner joined the group in 1966, they were on the wane; Bremner did not play on any of Lulu's recorded material, and joined just after the group recorded their only single without Lulu ("The House on the Hill"/"Most Unlovely") for Parlophone in 1966.  The Luvvers disbanded in 1967.

In 1971, Bremner added some guitar work to March Hare, the first solo album from ex-Honeybus member Colin Hare. He then became a member of the Neil Innes band Fatso, which went on to record the soundtrack for the original Rutland Weekend Television series.

As "Bill Murray" he released two singles produced by Kris Ife: "Downtown Hoedown" / "Rhyme And Reason" (Polydor 2058 881, 1977) and "Heart and the Stone" / "I Don't Wanna Be No Hero" (State Records STAT 72, 1978).

Next, he joined Rockpile, who only released one album under their own name, but also served as the band for most of Nick Lowe's and Dave Edmunds' albums in the 1970s. In addition to his guitar playing, Bremner occasionally sang lead, as he did on "Heart" and "You Ain't Nothing But Fine" on the 1980 Rockpile album Seconds of Pleasure.  He also wrote Edmunds' hit "Trouble Boys" (which Edmunds would let him sing live), but used an alias, Billy Murray, on the writing credits, so as not to be confused with the more famous Scottish footballer, of the same name.  "Trouble Boys" was covered by Thin Lizzy on a single in 1981. Another song by him, "The Creature from the Black Lagoon", appeared on Edmunds' third solo album, Repeat When Necessary.

After Rockpile split in 1981, Bremner released two solo singles on Stiff Records "Loud Music In Cars" / "The Price is Right" (BUY 125) and "Laughter Turns to Tears" / "Tired and Emotional" (BUY 143). Bremner then played lead guitar on The Pretenders' 1982 hit single "Back On The Chain Gang" / "My City Was Gone"  and later provided lead guitar for their 1990 album Packed!.

Bremner released his first solo album, Bash!, in 1984, containing songs co-written with The Records' Will Birch, and covers of songs by Elvis Costello, and Chris Difford and Glenn Tilbrook of Squeeze. Bash! featured a rhythm section of Dave Kerr-Clemenson from Fast Buck on bass and Terry Williams from Rockpile on drums. Bremner played all the guitar parts and sang the harmonies with Kerr-Clemenson.

After stints in Los Angeles, California, (where he played in the bands of Pat McLaughlin and Rosie Flores) and Nashville, Tennessee Bremner moved to Sweden in the 1990s where he met The Refreshments, producing and playing on their album It's Gotta Be Both Rock 'n' Roll.  A second solo album, A Good Week's Work, followed in 1999 and a third No Ifs, Buts, Maybes in 2006, both recorded in Sweden.  His most recent solo album, Rock Files, was issued in 2012.

Bremner was also a member of Stockholm-based band Trouble Boys with Sean Tyla and two Swedish musicians, who released an album called Bad Trouble in September 2012

Album discography

Solo
Bash! (1984)
A Good Week's Work (1998)
No Ifs, Buts, Maybes (2006)
Rock Files (2012)

As a member of Rockpile
Seconds of Pleasure	1980
Live at Montreux 1980	2011

As a sideman
With Dave Edmunds
Tracks on Wax 4	1978
Repeat When Necessary	1979
Twangin...'''	1981Pile of Rock: Live	2001

With Nick LoweJesus of Cool (UK) / Pure Pop for Now People (US) 1978Labour of Lust	1979Nick the Knife	1982Nick Lowe & His Cowboy Outfit 1984

With The PretendersLearning to Crawl	1984Packed!	1990Pirate Radio	2006

With Shakin' StevensGive Me Your Heart Tonight	1982Hits and More	2003Collectable	2004Collection	2005

 With Carlene CarterMusical Shapes	1980Blue Nun	1981

 With The Coal PortersLand of Hope and Crosby	1994London	1995Rebels Without Applause	1996

With Neil InnesTaking Off	1977The Rutland Weekend Songbook	1976

With Jim LauderdalePersimmons	1996Other Sessions	2000

With Trouble BoysBad Trouble (2012) Ball and Chain Records

With other artists
Anne Feeney – Look to the Left	1989
Anne Sofie von Otter & Elvis Costello – For the Stars 2001
Any Trouble – Wrong End of the Race	1984
Bob Young – In Quo Country	1980
Deke Leonard – Before Your Very Eyes	1981
Don Morrell – After All These Years	1999
Elvis Costello & the Attractions – Trust 1981
Foreigner – Mr. Moonlight	1995
George Ducas – George Ducas	1995
Howard Werth – Six of One and a Half Dozen of the Other	1996
John Gorman – Go Man Gorman	1977
Kelly Willis – Kelly Willis	1993
Kieran Kane – Find My Way Home	1993
Mickey Jupp – Juppanese	1978
Nirvana – To Markos III 1969
Pat McLaughlin – Pat McLaughlin	1988
Paul Kennerley – Misery with a Beat	1998
Phil Everly – Phil Everly	1983
Rosie Flores – Honky Tonk Reprise	1996
Snake Farm – What Kind of Dreams Are These	1989
The Refreshments – It's Gotta Be Both Rock 'n' Roll	2006
Totta Näslund – Totta, Vol. 3: En Dare Som Jag	2008
Roadwork – Round Two'' 2013

References

External links
Therockandrollarchive.com – Q&A session

1946 births
Living people
Scottish rock guitarists
Scottish male guitarists
The Pretenders members
musicians from Aberdeen
Rockpile members
Scottish singer-songwriters
20th-century Scottish male singers
Scottish expatriates in the United States
Scottish expatriates in Sweden
Lead guitarists
Rhythm guitarists
British rockabilly musicians